Hsieh Cheng-peng and Yang Tsung-hua were the defending tennis champions and successfully defended their title, defeating Evan King and Hunter Reese 6–4, 7–6(7–4) in the final.

Seeds

Draw

References

 Main draw

OEC Kaohsiung - Doubles
2019 Doubles
2019 in Taiwanese tennis